Ambroxide, widely known by the brand name Ambroxan, is a naturally occurring terpenoid and one of the key constituents responsible for the odor of ambergris. It is an autoxidation product of ambrein. Ambroxide is used in perfumery for creating ambergris notes and as a fixative. Small amounts (< 0.01 ppm) are used as a flavoring in food.

Synthesis 
Ambroxide is synthesized from sclareol, a component of the essential oil of clary sage. Sclareol is oxidatively degraded to a lactone, which is hydrogenated to the corresponding diol. The resulting compound is dehydrated to form ambroxide.

References 

Perfume ingredients
Flavors
Terpenes and terpenoids
Tetrahydrofurans
Decalins
Heterocyclic compounds with 3 rings